The counties of Liberia are subdivided into 136 administrative districts and 68 electoral districts.

See also
Counties of Liberia
Administrative divisions of Liberia

External links
Statoids 
Republic of Liberia: 2008 National Population and Housing Census Final Results 

 
Subdivisions of Liberia
Liberia, Districts
Liberia 2
Districts, Liberia
Districts